Pope Innocent VII (r. 1404–1406), the third Pope in the obedience of Rome during the Great Western Schism, created eleven new cardinals in one consistory celebrated on 12 June 1405:

Corrado Caraccioli, archbishop of Mileto and camerlengo of the Holy Roman Church − cardinal-priest of S. Crisogono, † 15 February 1411
Angelo Correr, Latin Patriarch of Constantinople, administrator of the see of Coron and governor of the March of Ancona − cardinal-priest of S. Marco (received the title on 20 October 1406), then Pope Gregory XII in the obedience of Rome (30 November 1406 until his abdication on 4 July 1415); became cardinal-bishop of Frascati (Tusculum) after his abdication (15 July 1415), † 18 October 1417
Francesco Uguccione, archbishop of Bordeaux − cardinal-priest of SS. IV Coronati, † 14 July 1412
Giordano Orsini, archbishop of Naples − cardinal-priest of SS. Silvestro e Martino, then cardinal-bishop of Albano (23 September 1412), cardinal-bishop of Sabiny (14 March 1431), † 29 May 1438
Giovanni Migliorati (nephew of the Pope), archbishop of Ravenna − cardinal-priest of S. Croce in Gerusalemme (received the title on 20 October 1406), † 16 October 1410
Pietro Filargo, OFM, archbishop of Milan − cardinal-priest of SS. XII Apostoli, then Antipope Alexander V in the obedience of Pisa (26 June 1409), † 3 May 1410
Antonio Arcioni, bishop of Ascoli Piceno − cardinal-priest of S. Pietro in Vincoli, † 21 July 1405
Antonio Calvi, bishop of Todi − cardinal-priest of S. Prassede, then cardinal-priest of S. Marco (2 July 1409), † 2 October 1411
Oddone Colonna, administrator of the suburbicarian see of Palestrina − cardinal-deacon of S. Giorgio in Velabro (received the title on 12 July 1405), became Pope Martin V on 11 November 1417, † 20 February 1431
Pietro Stefaneschi, protonotary apostolic − cardinal-deacon of S. Angelo in Pescheria, then cardinal-deacon of SS. Cosma e Damiano (2 June 1409) and again cardinal-deacon of S. Angelo in Pescheria (1410), † 30 October 1417
Jean Gilles, papal legate in the ecclesiastical provinces of Cologne, Reims and Trier − cardinal-deacon of SS. Cosma e Damiano (received the title on 12 January 1406), † 1 July 1408

Notes

Sources 

Konrad Eubel, Hierarchia Catholica, vol. I, Münster 1913
Martin Souchon: Die Papstwahlen in der Zeit des grossen Schismas, Vol. 1-2, Verlag von Benno Goeritz, 1898-1899

Innocent 7
College of Cardinals
15th-century Catholicism